Luria controversa, the 'Controversial Isabella', is a species of cowry, a sea snail, a marine gastropod mollusk in the family Cypraeidae, the cowries.

Some specialists consider Luria controversa a valid species (F. A. Schilder), while other authors (Felix Lorenz) regard this cowry as just a subspecies of Luria isabella (Luria isabella var. controversa).

Description
 The shells of this species reach  of length. They are smooth and elongate, the dorsum is pale brown, with slight longitudinal markings, dark brown or black terminals, and a flat white base.

Distribution and habitat
The 'Controversial Isabella' frequently occurs in the lagoon of islands and it is active at night, while  during day it hides under plates of dead coral or under rocks in cracks and crevices.

References

External links 
 Cowries
 Conch
 Biolib

Cypraeidae
Gastropods described in 1824
Taxa named by John Edward Gray